André D. Carson (born October 16, 1974) is an American politician serving as the U.S. representative for  since 2008. A member of the Democratic Party, his district includes the northern four-fifths of Indianapolis, including Downtown Indianapolis. He became the dean of Indiana's congressional delegation after Representative Pete Visclosky retired in 2021.

Carson is the grandson of his predecessor, U.S. Representative Julia Carson (1938–2007), whose death in office triggered a special election. He was the second Muslim to be elected to Congress, after Keith Ellison of Minnesota.

Personal life and early career 
André Carson was born and raised in Indianapolis. He graduated from Arsenal Technical High School in Indianapolis and received a Bachelor of Arts degree in criminal justice and management from Concordia University Wisconsin (2003), and a Master of Science degree in business management from Indiana Wesleyan University in Marion, Indiana (2005). At a young age, Carson's interest in public service was shaped by his grandmother, the late Congresswoman Julia Carson. Carson grew up in a rough neighborhood, and he credits that experience for shaping his policy views on issues like education, public safety and economic opportunity.

From 1996 to 2005, Carson worked as a compliance officer for the Indiana State Excise Police, the law enforcement arm of the Indiana Alcohol and Tobacco Commission. He was later employed in the anti-terrorism division of Indiana's Department of Homeland Security and then as a marketing specialist for Cripe Architects + Engineers in Indianapolis. He served as a member of the Indianapolis/Marion city-county council from 2007 to 2008.

In December 2007, Julia Carson, who had represented Indiana's 7th district in Congress since 1997, died of lung cancer. Three months later, Carson won a special election for his grandmother's vacant House seat. Carson has retained the seat ever since.

Before being elected to public office, Carson was a Democratic Party Committeeperson in Indianapolis. In 2007, he won a special caucus of the Marion County Democratic Party to become the City-County Councilor for the 15th Council district of Indianapolis-Marion County.

U.S. House of Representatives

Committee assignments 
House Permanent Select Committee on Intelligence
Subcommittee on Counterterrorism, Counterintelligence and Counterproliferation (Chair)
Subcommittee on Strategic Technologies and Advanced Research
House Committee on Transportation and Infrastructure
Subcommittee on Railroads, Pipelines, and Hazardous Materials
Subcommittee on Aviation

Caucus memberships 
Congressional Progressive Caucus
New Democrat Coalition
Congressional Arts Caucus
Afterschool Caucuses
Congressional Black Caucus
Congressional Automotive Caucus
Cancer Action Caucus
Children's Caucus
Climate Change Caucus
Human Rights Caucus
United States Congressional International Conservation Caucus
Labor and Working Families Caucus
Study Group on Public Health
Democratic Budget Group
LGBT Equality Caucus
Military Family Caucus
Renewable/Efficient Energy Caucus
Americans Abroad Caucus

He also serves as the Congressional Black Caucus liaison to the Sustainable Energy and Environment Coalition (CBC Liaison).

In the 2008 presidential election, Carson endorsed Barack Obama in April 2008, and later won Obama's endorsement in his own May 2008 Democratic primary. Carson was the first member of Indiana's Congressional delegation to announce his support for Obama.

Tenure 
On March 20, 2010, Carson told reporters that health care protesters outside the Capitol hurled racial slurs at fellow Congressional Black Caucus (CBC) member John Lewis. Carson came off the House floor and told reporters his story about health care protesters hurling racial slurs during their walk from the Cannon House Office Building to the chambers. Although audio and video recordings of the protest have been posted online, no proof of the racial slurs has yet been provided, and the reward remains unclaimed.

On August 28, 2011, Carson addressed a gathering of supporters and mentioned the Tea Party movement during his speech. "This is the effort that we're seeing of Jim Crow," Carson said. "Some of these folks in Congress right now would love to see us as second-class citizens. Some of them in Congress right now of this Tea Party movement would love to see you and me... hanging on a tree." Carson declined calls to resign, reaffirming, "I stand on the truth of what I spoke", and clarified that his comments were directed at certain Tea Party leaders and not the movement as a whole.

Political positions

Afghanistan and Iraq 
Carson believes that "American efforts to capture and kill al Qaeda terrorists have greatly diminished" because of the Iraq War. During the War in Afghanistan, Carson often stated his belief that al Qaeda and the Taliban posed the most imminent threat to the United States. Accordingly, he pushed for a reduction of troops in Iraq to cover the needs of the War in Afghanistan.

Consumer protection 
On June 26, 2009, Carson introduced the Jeremy Warriner Consumer Protection Act, which would require GM and Chrysler to carry liability insurance that would cover vehicles produced before they filed for bankruptcy in early 2009. The bill is named for Jeremy Warriner, an Indianapolis resident who lost his legs when his defective Chrysler vehicle caught fire during a car accident.

Disease prevention 

On July 24, 2008, Carson voted to pass the Tom Lantos and Henry J. Hyde United States Global Leadership Against HIV/AIDS, Tuberculosis, and Malaria Reauthorization Act which provided aid to developing countries fighting high rates of HIV/AIDS, malaria, and tuberculosis. He successfully amended the bill to create "a transatlantic, technological medium of exchange that allows African scientists and American medical professionals to collaborate on the best methods for treating and preventing the spread of HIV/AIDS on the African continent."

Economic recovery 
On February 13, 2009, Carson voted to pass the H.R. 1, the American Recovery and Reinvestment Act of 2009, a $787 billion economic stimulus package aimed at helping the economy recover from a deepening worldwide recession. This act included increased federal spending for health care, infrastructure, education, various tax breaks and incentives, and direct assistance to individuals.

The ARRA has led to billions of dollars in investment in Carson's district, including grants to hire more police officers and save teaching jobs, and landmark investments in green technology that will create hundreds of new jobs.

Education 
Carson has stated his support for programs that improve teacher education and training, improve aging school infrastructure and increase access to affordable, secondary education.

Carson is the author of H.R. 3147, the Young Adults Financial Literacy Act, which was introduced on July 9, 2009. This legislation would establish a grant program to fund partnerships between educational institutions aimed at providing financial literacy education to young adults and families.

On September 17, 2009, Carson voted to pass H.R. 3221, the Student Aid and Fiscal Responsibility Act, which will invest in the Pell Grant program and other student financial aid programs to make college more affordable.

Carson made a speech to an Islamic group that resulted in criticism from groups when he stated that American public schools should be modeled on Islamic madrassas. He granted an interview to reporter Mary Beth Schneider of The Indianapolis Star in which he maintained his remarks had been taken out of context. On the same date, he issued a press release clarifying his position that no "particular faith should be the foundation of our public schools."

Energy and environment 
Carson has supported investment in the development of new technologies to reduce American dependence on foreign oil, create new jobs and begin to mitigate fossil fuels' adverse environmental effects. He has opposed legislation to increase offshore drilling for oil or natural gas, instead promoting use of solar, wind, biofuel, biomass, and other renewable fuels.

On June 26, 2009, Carson voted to pass H.R. 2454, the American Clean Energy and Security Act, which seeks to comprehensively address the effects of climate change by funding development of alternative energy technologies and implementing a cap and trade system.

Financial services 
Carson has been a member of the House Committee on Financial Services since taking office in 2008.

Carson voted to pass legislation enacting the Troubled Asset Relief Program on October 3, 2008. He has also voted to pass legislation increasing oversight over the Troubled Asset Relief Program, limiting executive pay, reforming subprime mortgage markets and regulating the financial industry.

Carson co-sponsored , the Credit Cardholders Bill of Rights, which sought to increase transparency and regulation in the credit card industry. President Obama signed the legislation into law on May 22, 2009.

Carson has voiced his support for legislation creating the Consumer Finance Protection Agency and monitoring systemic risk in the financial sector.

Health care reform 
Carson is a strong supporter of health care reform legislation that increases access to medical care for millions of uninsured Americans and provides a more stable system for those at risk of losing their health insurance. On July 30, 2009, he signed a letter from the Congressional Progressive Caucus to House leadership, calling for a robust public option to be included in any health care reform bill.

He has opposed taxes both on the medical device industry and employer-provided health insurance plans as a means to pay for health care reform. Instead, he has called for finding savings in the current health system by reducing waste, fraud and abuse in the Medicare system, as well as implementing a surcharge on the wealthiest Americans as a means to cover the costs of reform. He has also voiced his opposition for health care reform legislation that increases the deficit.

On November 7, 2009, Carson voted to pass H.R. 3962, the Affordable Health Care for America Act, the House version of legislation designed to reform the American health insurance industry.

Housing 
Citing a high foreclosure rate in Indianapolis, Carson has named foreclosure prevention and increased affordable housing among his top priorities.

On May 7, 2009, Carson voted to pass the Mortgage Reform and Anti-Predatory Lending Act of 2009, which regulates the mortgage lending industry by setting limits on types of loans offered to potential borrowers. He authored an amendment to the legislation that funded the distribution of information about foreclosure rescue scams through targeted mailings.

Impeachment of Donald Trump 
On December 18, 2019, Carson voted for both articles of impeachment against President Donald Trump and was one of only two House members from Indiana to do so, along with Pete Visclosky.

Israel 
Carson is opposed to the Israeli settlements in Palestinian territory, calling them "illegitimate and a major barrier to peace".

In July 2019, Carson voted against a House resolution condemning the Global Boycott, Divestment, and Sanctions Movement targeting Israel. The resolution passed 398–17.

In September 2021, Carson was one of nine House members to vote against funding Israel's Iron Dome missile defense program.

National security 

Carson is the only member of Congress to have served in a Department of Homeland Security Fusion Center. He has voted to increase appropriations funding for the Department of Homeland Security. In 2017, Carson attended a protest at Indianapolis International Airport against President Trump's executive order to temporarily place limits on immigration until better screening methods are devised. Carson decried the executive order as part of a "bigotry campaign", saying: "For those who want to make America great again, we have to remind them that the first article of the constitution says Congress shall make no law respecting [the] establishment of religion. Make no mistake about it: This is a Muslim ban."

Syria 
In 2023, Carson was among 56 Democrats to vote in favor of H.Con.Res. 21, which directed President Joe Biden to remove U.S. troops from Syria within 180 days.

Public safety 
In 2009, Carson introduced two pieces of legislation aimed at reducing recidivism. The Recidivism Reduction Act aims to attack the cycle of recidivism by ensuring prompt access to federal supplemental security income and Medicaid benefits for ex-offenders reentering society and addressing the gap in mental health services. The Personal Responsibility and Work Opportunity Reconciliation Act would repeal federal laws that prevent drug felons from receiving TANF benefits.

In 2008, Carson helped the City of Indianapolis secure a federal COPS grant to hire more police officers. The grant was awarded as part of the ARRA.

Political campaigns

2008 
Special election

In 2008, Carson won the nominating caucus of the Marion County Democratic Party, giving him the Democratic nomination for the special election to succeed his late grandmother, Julia Carson. During this election, he was endorsed by U.S. Senator Evan Bayh, then-Senator Barack Obama, former Indianapolis Mayor Bart Peterson, Marion County Sheriff Frank J. Anderson, then-Representative from Indiana's 8th district Brad Ellsworth, and retired U.S. Representative Andy Jacobs, Jr. House Majority Leader Steny Hoyer and House Speaker Nancy Pelosi contributed $4,000 each from their own campaign funds and $10,000 each from their political action committees to the Carson campaign.

Carson defeated Republican State Representative Jon Elrod and Libertarian Sean Shepard in the special election on March 11, 2008, securing 53% of the vote.

Carson won the primary election with 46%, while Woody Myers received 24%, David Orentlicher received 21%, and Carolene Mays received 8%. Carson was set to face Elrod in the general election, but Elrod dropped out. Gabrielle Campo was selected by a party caucus to replace Elrod.

Carson was reelected in November 2008 to his first full term in Congress with 65% of the vote. His hometown newspaper, The Indianapolis Star, has praised him for "going strong" in his first year in office, writing that Carson had proved "himself to be relentlessly positive and seriously hardworking."

2010 

In 2010, Carson again faced perennial Republican candidate Marvin Scott, who took issue with Carson's Muslim faith during the general election. Carson handily defeated Scott.

2012

2014

2016

2018

2020

2022

See also 
List of African-American United States representatives
 List of Muslim members of the United States Congress

References

External links 

Congressman André Carson official U.S. House website
André Carson for Congress

 

|-

1974 births
21st-century American politicians
African-American members of the United States House of Representatives
African-American Muslims
African-American people in Indiana politics
American former Christians
Concordia University Wisconsin alumni
Converts to Islam from Protestantism
Democratic Party members of the United States House of Representatives from Indiana
Indiana Wesleyan University alumni
Indianapolis City-County Council members
African-American city council members
Living people
Muslim members of the United States House of Representatives
Arsenal Technical High School alumni
21st-century African-American politicians
20th-century African-American people